The Juno Award for Francophone Album of the Year is an annual award presented by the Canadian Academy of Recording Arts and Sciences (CARAS) for the best French-language album in Canada. Wanting to add a more inclusive Canadian content to the Award show, Isba Music's Larry Mancini lobbied CARAS to add this award to its roster. It was awarded as the Best Selling Francophone Album, based entirely on album sales, but is now chosen by a jury vote.

Recipients

Best Selling Francophone Album (1992–2002)

Francophone Album of the Year (2003–present)

References

Francophone Album
Album awards
Francophone music
French-language mass media in Canada